Sven Van Der Jeugt (born 17 September 1980) is a retired Belgian football goalkeeper. He is currently the goalkeeper coach of Waasland-Beveren.

Coaching career
After retiring at the end of the 2015/16 season, Van Der Jeugt became goalkeeper coach of Patro Eisden. He left the club six months later.

In July 2017, he then became goalkeeper coach of Thes Sport, which he was for one year. He then moved to his former club Anderlecht and became goalkeeper coach for the reserve team / U21 squad.

On 25 June 2019, he was appointed goalkeeper coach of Waasland-Beveren.

References

1980 births
Living people
Belgian footballers
R.S.C. Anderlecht players
K.S.C. Lokeren Oost-Vlaanderen players
S.V. Zulte Waregem players
Lierse S.K. players
RFC Liège players
Sint-Truidense V.V. players
Fortuna Sittard players
K.V.K. Tienen-Hageland players
Royal Antwerp F.C. players
Association football goalkeepers
Belgian Pro League players
Challenger Pro League players
Eerste Divisie players
Belgian expatriate footballers
Expatriate footballers in the Netherlands
People from Diest
KFC Houtvenne players
Footballers from Flemish Brabant